Kisan Vikas Party (Peasant Development Party) is a small political party in the Indian state of Bihar. It is probably a splinter group from the Bharatiya Janata Party (BJP).

Agrarian parties in India
Bharatiya Janata Party breakaway groups
Political parties in Bihar
Political schisms
Political parties with year of establishment missing